Club Babyhead was a nightclub and hard rock music venue in Providence, Rhode Island.

The venue was located at 73 Richmond Street. It was known for being dark and gritty.

Club nights 
In 1992 and 1993, Club Babyhead was the only local venue providing space for hardcore acts. The majority of audience members at these shows were young white men. Audience members at the club's hardcore shows often engaged in moshing.

Club Babyhead hosted a "Stupid Dance Party" Thursday and Sunday nights, that featured an eclectic mix of music DJ'ed by Jared Dubois.

The club hosted electronic club nights that attracted the rave scene.

Club Babyhead regularly featured matinées, which teenagers attended.

Featured musicians 
From 1990 to 1997, Club Babyhead featured performances from Buzzcocks, Babes in Toyland, Electrafixion, Shelter, The Breeders, Scarce, Alanis Morissette, Yo La Tengo, Melvins, The Mighty Mighty Bosstones, Pearl Jam, The Smashing Pumpkins, Nirvana, Meat Puppets, Mudhoney, Blind Melon, Bo Diddley, Green Day, The Dead Kennedys, Arab on Radar, Godflesh, Marilyn Manson, Deftones, Catherine Wheel, The Proletariat, Snuff, Butt Trumpet, Throwing Muses, Goo Goo Dolls, Samiam, Only Living Witness, and Korn.

Nirvana show 
On September 25, 1991, Nirvana performed alongside Melvins at Club Babyhead. The show occurred a day after Nevermind was released, as part of Nirvana's Nevermind tour. Kurt Cobain broke his amp while the band played the first song "Jesus Doesn’t Want Me for a Sunbeam", a cover of "Jesus Wants Me for a Sunbeam" by The Vaselines. During the performance, the band played several covers, including "Here She Comes Now" by The Velvet Underground and "D-7" by The Wipers. That night, Nirvana played, “Help Me, I’m Hungry”, which they rarely performed. As Cobain was having technical problems during the show, he smashed his Boss DS-1 Distortion pedal on stage, and threw it into the crowd. In 2020, the pedal was sold on Julien's Auctions for $8,960.

References 

Arts centers in Rhode Island
Arts organizations based in Rhode Island
Buildings and structures in Providence, Rhode Island
Electronic dance music venues
Music venues in Rhode Island
New wave music
Performing arts centers in Rhode Island
Punk rock venues
Rock music venues
Social centres in the United States
Theatres in Rhode Island
Tourist attractions in Providence, Rhode Island
Underground culture